Football Cup of the Ukrainian SSR was a playoff republican competitions in association football that were taken place in Ukrainian SSR in 1936–1991 and were predecessors of the Ukrainian Cup. The competition was originally called as a Football championship of UkrSSR among the best teams of sports societies in 1936 and 1937. The first cup was awarded in 1937 and starting since 1938, the competition was renamed as Football cup competitions of the Ukrainian SSR as it was commemorated on the Soviet envelope.

History
The participation was allowed to everybody whether it was a team of the Soviet Top League or a team of some education institution as long as none of the players competed in the Soviet Cup simultaneously. Early seasons of the cup tournament were called as a spring challenge, which allowed to consider them as a championship title competition rather than cup competition. However, older documents of the Ministry of Youth and Sports show that the spring challenge competitions were indeed considered as a football cup competition.

In 1939, 1940 and since 1949 no teams from the Soviet Top League participated in the competition. In 1959 the competition among teams of masters was replaced with competition for amateur clubs (see Ukrainian Amateur Cup).

In 1972 it was revived again for the next five seasons and one more time in 1990, while competition for physical fitness clubs at that time discontinued. The last winner FC Temp Shepetivka of the Soviet Ukrainian Cup was allowed to join the Ukrainian Premier League in 1991.

During the World War II, the crystal trophy, cup of the Ukrainian SSR, was not evacuated and was stolen by one of employees of the All-Ukrainian Council of Physical Culture. During the Nazi occupation of Kiev, the trophy appeared in a store of random things at Velyka Vasylkivska street and was spotted by Kiev footballers who stayed behind and played for a local team Rukh Kyiv. The athletes informed the municipal department of education and culture which in turn on 19 May 1942 wrote a letter to the administration of the antique store with a request to return them the Cup and inform the name of individual who pawned it in the store. It is unknown if the person who stole the trophy was ever found, but the Cup was returned. In such way the athletes who later labeled as "traitors" by the Soviet regime saved the trophy for Ukrainian football of post war period.

Championship of the Proletarian Sports Society Dynamo
Parallel to the championship of cities there also existed separate tournament that was played among teams of Dynamo society (Proletarian Sports Society (PST) Dynamo) located throughout the Ukrainian SSR. The first tournament was conducted as part of the All-Ukrainian Dynamo Festival which was organized on the orders of the top OGPU official in Ukraine Vsevolod Balitsky. The tournament was also known as the Dynamiada of Ukraine. There existed some degree of confusion due to great number of tournaments at that time.

Finals

Finals

Performances

External links
 Cup of the Ukrainian SSR at footballfacts.ru
 The Bowl Contests of 80 years of age (Битви за Чашу восьмидесятилітньої давнини) . Ukrainian Premier League. 11 May 2017.

Notes

References

External links
 «Динамо» — сила в русі. 1927.kiev.ua.
 .

 
Football cup competitions in Ukraine
Ukrainian SSR
Ukraine
Recurring sporting events established in 1936
1936 establishments in Ukraine
Sport in the Ukrainian Soviet Socialist Republic
Defunct football competitions in Ukraine
1991 disestablishments in Ukraine
Recurring events disestablished in 1991